A Complete: All Singles (stylized as:  COMPLETE ~ALL SINGLES~) is a greatest hits album by Japanese singer Ayumi Hamasaki, released on September 10, 2008, to commemorate her tenth anniversary with Avex Trax. It compiles all of Hamasaki's singles from 1998 to 2008, with one new track.

The album was promoted with one single, new track "Mirrorcle World". Released on April 8, 2008, it debuted at number one in Japan, selling over 250,000 copies and receiving a platinum certification, Hamasaki's first single to do so since "Blue Bird" in 2006. The album's track listing omits two of Hamasaki's singles, these being "A Song Is Born" and "Together When...". The first press of the album came in a special box along with a forty-eight-page photobook that includes previously unreleased alternate single covers. The album was released in 3CD and 3CD+DVD formats.

A Complete debuted at number one in Japan, with first-week sales of 538,876 copies. In its 38-week chart run, it sold 1,120,000 copies in Japan. It became her best-selling album since (Miss)understood, and was certified 3× Platinum for shipments of 750,000 copies to stores. In Taiwan and China, it became the best-selling Japanese album of 2008. A Complete was the eighth best-selling album of 2008 in Japan and the third best-selling by a female artist, behind Namie Amuro's Best Fiction and Hikaru Utada's Heart Station.

A Complete reached number one on the Oricon Digital Weekly Album chart in May 2020. As of that date, the album sold almost 100,000 digital copies to this date.

Information
A Complete includes all of Hamasaki's A-side single tracks since her first single "Poker Face" up to "Mirrorcle World". Many tracks on the album have been remastered such as "M", "Audience", "Poker Face", and "To Be". Shortly after the release of A Complete Hamasaki announced that the Taiwanese version will include a Chinese version of "Who...". The album sold 538,876 copies by the end of the first week, debuting at #1 making it Hamasaki's first release to sell over 500,000 copies since My Story except (Miss)understoods combined first and second week sales due to Oricon's 51-week rule.

Promotion
Hamasaki was scheduled to appear in magazines Sweet, Bea's Up, Vivi and Beatfreak to promote the album. Additionally, she held a promotional campaign in which those who ordered the album online received a gift.

Track listing
All tracks are single mixes except songs which were recut singles, which are original album mixes.

ChartsOricon Sales Chart (Japan)'

Singles

Physical sales and rank

Release history

References

2008 greatest hits albums
Albums recorded at Zepp Tokyo
Ayumi Hamasaki compilation albums
Avex Group compilation albums
Japanese-language albums